Quasiconcha is a genus of fungi in the family Mytilinidiaceae. A monotypic genus, it contains the single species Quasiconcha reticulata.

References

External links 
 Index Fungorum

Mytilinidiales
Monotypic Dothideomycetes genera